James Francis Courage (9 February 1903–5 October 1963) was a New Zealand novelist, short-story writer, poet and bookseller. He was born in Christchurch, Canterbury, New Zealand on 9 February 1903.

He moved to England as a young man, dying in Hampstead.

Courage told his diary: "Why do I go on writing? One reason is that I believe I’ve written about people in Canterbury as it has never been done before – just as Turgenev​ wrote about certain people in Russian provincial society as it had not been done before."

Novels 
 One House (1933)
 The Fifth child (1948) 
 Desire without content (1950) 
 Fires in the distance (1952) 
 The young have secrets (1954) 
 The call home (1956) 
 A way of Love (1959) 
 The visit to Penmorten (1961)

References

Further reading
 Brickell, Chris "James Courage Diaries", Otago University Press, 2021
Giffuni, Cathe. "James Courage: A Checklist of Published Primary and Secondary Sources, 1925-1986," JNZL: Journal of New Zealand Literature, No. 5, 1987.

External links
 

1903 births
1963 deaths
New Zealand male poets
New Zealand male novelists
20th-century New Zealand novelists
New Zealand male short story writers
New Zealand expatriates in the United Kingdom
New Zealand LGBT novelists
People educated at Christ's College, Christchurch
20th-century New Zealand poets
20th-century New Zealand male writers
20th-century New Zealand dramatists and playwrights
New Zealand male dramatists and playwrights
20th-century New Zealand short story writers
New Zealand booksellers
20th-century New Zealand LGBT people
New Zealand LGBT poets